Rivervale may refer to:

In Australia
 Rivervale, Western Australia, a suburb of Perth

In Singapore
 Rivervale, Singapore, a precinct of the district of Sengkang located in north-eastern Singapore

In the United States
 Rivervale, Arkansas, a small town five miles out of Lepanto
 Rivervale, Indiana
 River Vale, New Jersey, a township

In television
 Season 6 Part 1 of Riverdale, which was temporarily renamed Rivervale
 The parallel universe version of the fictional town of Riverdale in the series